Brittany Persaud (born 1 April 1990) is an American-born Guyanese footballer who plays as a forward for Westside Timbers FC, and recently played for Portland Thorns FC of the American National Women's Soccer League (NWSL).

Persaud has been a member of the Guyana women's national team. She played college soccer for Dayton and Wright State.

College career 
At Wright State, Persaud was the all-time leader in assists with 24 during her three-year Raider career, and eighth in points with 56 (16 goals, 24 assists) and shots attempted with 146.

Club career 
Persaud played for the Swedish team Kungsbacka DFF in 2012.

Returning to the United States, Persaud signed on with the Ohio-based Dayton Dutch Lions WFC in 2015, appeared on the bench for Portland Thorns FC during the 2021 NWSL Challenge Cup, and plays for the Westside Timbers of Women's Premier Soccer League.

International career 
Scores and results list Guyana's goal tally first

Managerial career 
In 2019, Persaud was a part of the coaching team for Guyana's U20 Women's Team

Honours 
ADO Den Haag
Winner
 KNVB Women's Cup: 2012–13

Runners-up
 BeNe Super Cup: 2012–13

Personal life 
Persaud obtained her Bachelor of Science in Biological Sciences, Exercise Science at Wright State She also earned a Master of Science in Human Movement Sciences at Vrije Universiteit Amsterdam in the Netherlands during her European football career.

See also 
 List of Guyana women's international footballers

References

External links 
 

1990 births
Living people
Citizens of Guyana through descent
Guyanese women's footballers
Women's association football forwards
Telstar (women's football club) players
ADO Den Haag (women) players
Guyana women's international footballers
Guyanese expatriate footballers
Guyanese expatriate sportspeople in Sweden
Expatriate women's footballers in Sweden
Guyanese expatriate sportspeople in the Netherlands
Expatriate women's footballers in the Netherlands
Indo-Guyanese people
People from Westerville, Ohio
Soccer players from Columbus, Ohio
American women's soccer players
Dayton Flyers women's soccer players
Wright State Raiders women's soccer players
Portland Thorns FC players
American expatriate women's soccer players
American expatriate sportspeople in Sweden
American expatriate sportspeople in the Netherlands
American sportspeople of Guyanese descent
American people of Indo-Guyanese descent